Echoing Delight is an album by Vidna Obmana, released on October 5, 1993 through Extreme Records.

Track listing

Personnel 
Doriana Corda – cover art
Tom Kloeck – gong and percussion on "Winter Mouvement"
Vidna Obmana – instruments, tape, drum machine, percussion, didgeridoo, voice, arrangement
Djen Ajakan Shean – drum machine, percussion and arrangement on "Narrow Gloom (Part Two)"

References 

1993 albums
Extreme Records albums
Vidna Obmana albums